An Infamous Army is a novel by Georgette Heyer. In this novel Heyer combines her penchant for meticulously researched historical novels with her more popular period romances. So in addition to being a Regency romance, it is one of the most historically accurate and vividly narrated descriptions of the Battle of Waterloo. An Infamous Army completes the sequence begun with These Old Shades (although there is an inconsistency in the time line, with These Old Shades set in 1755, Devil's Cub set 25 years later, with only 35 years until the setting of An Infamous Army, during which time there are supposed to be two grown generations) and is also a sequel to Regency Buck.

Plot summary
In the early summer of 1815, while the Battle of Waterloo is just a threat, Brussels is the most exciting city in Europe and many of the British aristocracy have rented homes there. The novel opens in the home of Lord and Lady Worth, where several of their friends are discussing the precarious situation in Belgium. Everyone is anxious for the Duke of Wellington to arrive from Vienna. When the other guests leave, Judith (Lady Worth)'s brother, Sir Peregrine Taverner (Perry), expresses his fears about remaining in Brussels, especially since his wife, Harriet is expecting their third child. In the end he decides that if his brother-in-law deems it safe to stay, then it must be safe enough. After he goes, Judith tells her husband about her hopes that Worth's brother, Colonel the Hon. Charles Audley (who is a member of Wellington's staff and is still in Vienna) will fall in love with her new friend, Miss Lucy Devenish. This leads her husband to accuse her of trying to play matchmaker and remark, "I perceive that life in Brussels is going to be even more interesting than I had expected."

Amongst the fashionable ton partying in the metropolis, Lady Barbara Childe (the granddaughter of Dominic, Duke of Avon) is making her mark. Lady Barbara, or Bab as she is called by her family and friends, is a young widow of great beauty and charm who can make any man fall in love with her. Her elder brother, the Marquis of Vidal highly disapproves of his sister's flirtations and is annoyed that she has made herself the talk of fashionable society. Furthermore, Bab has taken up with the notorious Belgian Comte de Lavisse. It is the general consensus that Bab is heartless. Bab has another two brothers besides the Marquis: Lord George Alistair, who was said to look and act exactly like his grandfather did in his younger days and Lord Harry Alistair, aged eighteen. Both are serving in the army. After a ball, (where Bab had scandalised Brussels by appearing with painted toenails) her sister-in-law, Lady Vidal, warns Bab that if she or any of her brothers cause a scandal, the Marquis will insist on them all returning to England. To which Lady Barbara responds that she would simply stay in Brussels alone.

A few days later, Judith is surprised to walk into her parlour one morning and find that Charles had arrived. The Duke and his staff were finally in Brussels. Later that evening, at another party, Charles sees Barbara for the first time and is enchanted. This dismays Judith as she wanted Charles to fall in love with Lucy and as such she refuses to introduce Charles to her.
As a result, Charles asks his friend, the young Prince of Orange to make his introduction. Against the advice of their other friends, the Prince agrees, but not before warning Charles that "it is the road to ruin." Charles and Bab dance together twice, leading nearly the whole assembly to whisper about how Bab had seized upon the nicest man in Brussels. A little while later, Charles meets Lucy Devenish looking quite dishevelled and upset. He doesn't ask her for any explanation and after he helped her fix herself up, the two become friendly. At the end of the party, Judith is at ease because Charles had admired Lucy and had not said anything about Bab. Worth however feels that Charles is already head over heels in love with Bab.

The next day, Charles meets Bab with her notorious Belgian suitor, the Count de Lavisse. Needless to say, the two men do not get on very well. However, Charles seems to have made an impression on Bab for she confesses to Lady Vidal that she has lost her heart to a younger son. Some time later, Charles asks Bab to marry him and she accepts, but not before warning him that she would make a terrible wife and that she might change her mind in a week. Charles only laughs and says that he is willing to risk it. Judith is dismayed and cannot understand what Charles sees in the girl. Charles is adamant that Judith will like Barbara once she gets to know her. Meanwhile, Bab is worried that she will change her mind, so she asks Charles to marry her soon. He refuses because he wants her to be certain that she loves him before she marries him. This leads Bab to say that Charles is a much better person then she is.

Meanwhile, Barbara's brother George arrives in Brussels. He shows up uninvited to a party given by Lord and Lady Worth, in search of his various siblings. He makes his excuses to Judith and is about to go off in search of Bab, when Judith is surprised to see him staring at Lucy Devenish. Her surprise increases when Lord George excuses himself, saying, "I have seen a lady I know. I must go pay my respects." He promptly goes to Lucy's side and looks teasingly at her downcast face. When Judith questions the two, George explains that they had met several times and that he was worried that Lucy had forgotten him. Lucy looks at him with reproach and says that she did not forget. She then walks away to find her aunt and George goes off to look for Bab. Judith seeks out Lucy to ask her about the strange meeting. Lucy brushes her off and says that she doesn't wish to speak of Lord George Alistair. After the party, George and Bab discuss her engagement, revealing the depth of her feelings for Charles as well as her reasons for being so callous a flirt. She had been married at eighteen to a much older man named Jasper Childe whom she grew to hate, and she swore from then on that no man would possess her ever again. And now, even though she loves Charles, she cannot help rebelling against him.

Lady Barbara is determined to make sure that Charles knows how awful she is. He endures much of her flirtations. At one point, it becomes too much. Harriet Taverner, Judith's brother's wife, had snubbed Bab, leading Bab to charm Perry as punishment. Lady Taverner is devastated and Charles takes the matter into his own hands. In a way that reminds Perry unpleasantly of Worth, Charles tells him that he must leave for England at once and be done with such nonsense. Perry agrees with him and immediately makes arrangements to go home, but not before making peace with his wife. This leads to a violent quarrel between Barbara and Charles and their engagement is terminated. After the quarrel, Charles meets Lucy who is extremely upset about something. Charles convinces Lucy to confide in him and she does so.

All of Charles's friends are distressed at his unhappiness. He had a new hard look and he rarely smiles. He and Lucy have become very close and Bab goes around creating bigger scandals every day. Then, at the Duchess of Richmond's famous ball, comes the news that Napoleon is marching towards the Belgian border. The city soon empties of officers including Charles, George, Harry and nearly every other young man at the ball. The next day, Barbara goes in search of Charles, desperate to make peace with him before the battle, only to learn from Judith Audley that he has gone. When Worth discovers that Barbara's brother, the Marquis of Vidal, has gone back to England, Worth takes Barbara in.

Lady Barbara is convinced that Charles has fallen in love with Lucy, until Lucy goes to see Barbara to ask her if she heard anything from her brother George. Lucy then confesses that she and George have been married for nearly a year. The marriage had been kept secret because neither the Duke of Avon (George's grandfather) nor Lucy's uncle Mr. Fisher would have approved of the match. Until now she had confided in no one but Charles who promised to look out for George.

By now the wounded are starting to arrive in Brussels from the first skirmishes and Judith and Barbara help to nurse the wounded in the street. As the situation becomes more and more desperate, the two women become very close, Barbara is finally showing her true inner strength and courage. At the end of the whole thing Judith admits to her husband that she had misjudged both Barbara and Lucy from the start.

The entire second half of the book is devoted to a historically accurate, almost minute by minute account of the Battle of Waterloo, one of the most sanguinary and pivotal battles in history. All the historic events are recounted in detail, including the magnificent charge of the Scots Greys and the final turning point where Wellington himself tells the final line of defence, the British First Foot Guards, to "Up Guards and at'em". The Guards rise from behind the slope of a hill and from their extended line pour such a devastating fire upon the attacking French column that the French withdraw in disarray. Seeing this, Colonel Sir John Colborne leads his regiment, the Fighting 52nd, across the battlefield from the right flank and Wellington calls for a general advance of Peregrine Maitland's Grenadier Guards, completing the French rout.

During the battle, Charles comes upon Lord Harry Alistair, who is obviously dying. Charles reflects on how he has lost so many friends in one day. While trying to deliver a message from Wellington, Charles is hit by cannon fire. Badly wounded, he is carried off the field by his old rival Lavisse, whose regiment has fled in disarray. Lavisse tells him he will see to the delivery of the message but admits that the honours of the day go to Audley.

The Duke and Duchess of Avon arrive in Brussels having heard of all the scandals that their grandchildren have been making. While they are at the Worth's, Charles's servant comes to tell the Earl about his master's condition. Worth goes to find him and bring him to Brussels and he promises Bab that he will bring Charles back safely.

When Worth brings Charles back, he is in danger of his life and has had his left arm amputated. The surgeons say that they might have to amputate his leg as well, but Worth steps in and stops them from doing it. Charles regains lucidity, aided by the ministrations of the Duchess of Avon. Although he is not the carefree young man he once was, Charles proposes once more to Bab, telling her to take out the ring that she had given back to him, "there it stays until I give you another in its place". Bab accepts, promising that she will make him a terrible wife, but she doesn't care.

1937 British novels
Novels by Georgette Heyer
Historical novels
Fiction set in 1815
Works about the Battle of Waterloo
Brussels in fiction
Novels set in Belgium
Heinemann (publisher) books
Cultural depictions of Arthur Wellesley, 1st Duke of Wellington
Cultural depictions of Gebhard Leberecht von Blücher
Cultural depictions of Napoleon